Underground is the second studio album by the American garage rock band, The Electric Prunes, and was released in 1967 on Reprise Records. It would be the final album of any materialized input by band members until the 1969 "New Improved" Electric Prunes were formed. The album was a moderate chart hit, but, without a hit-ready single, the band could not repeat their past success.

In 2011, it was included in NME's "The 100 Greatest Albums You've Never Heard" list, chosen by Andrew VanWyngarden of MGMT.

Background 

The album, Underground, brought changes to the band once recording began. Limited lyrical input plagued the band's creative process on their debut. Only one track, composed by Mark Tulin and James Lowe, called "Lovin'" was included on their first album. This changed with this album because Dave Hassinger, the group's producer, was not as active in the sessions resulting in nine of the 12 tracks becoming the band's own material. With so much more musical freedom, the band could mold their music into their own image. The final products were a more direct and cohesive set of songs that reflected the band's own design.

The band continued in their utilization of distorted sound effects, fuzz-toned guitar instrumentals, and experimented with a Vox organ. Regarding the playing of the organ Lowe said, "they brought a prototype in, and took it back after they heard what we did with it." Near the end of recording, however, two band members left. Preston Ritter's departure stemmed from musical differences, and James Spagnola left due to medical issues. Their replacements were original drummer Michael Fortune and new member Mike Gannon. As a result of being brought in late, Fortune appeared on five tracks and only two included Gannon. Gannon also is featured on the non-album single "Everybody Knows You're Not in Love".

Underground was released in August 1967 and became a moderate success, charting at number 172 nationally. Without a hit single, the album could not reach more popularity. This lineup consisting of Tulin, Lowe, Williams, Fortune, and Gannon would tour to promote the album. They played across the United States in prestigious venues like The Crystal Ballroom in Portland, and were the only lineup, until the reformation 30 years later, to tour Europe. A live album called Stockholm '67 was recorded material from a concert on this tour that was released 30 years later.

Track listing
Side one
 "The Great Banana Hoax" (James Lowe, Mark Tulin) – 4:09
 "Children of Rain" (Goodie Williams, Ken Williams) – 2:37
 "Wind-Up Toys" (Lowe, Tulin) – 2:26
 "Antique Doll" (Nancy Mantz, Annette Tucker) – 3:13
 "It's Not Fair" (Lowe, Tulin) – 2:04
 "I Happen to Love You" (Gerry Goffin, Carole King) – 3:15
Side two
 "Dr. Do-Good" (Mantz, Tucker) – 2:26
 "I" (Mantz, Tucker) – 5:14
 "Hideaway" (Lowe, Tulin) – 2:42
 "Big City" (Johnny Walsh, Dan Walsh) – 2:46
 "Captain Glory" (Lowe) – 2:14
 "Long Day's Flight" (Michael "Quint" Weakley, Don Yorty) – 3:12

CD bonus tracks
 "Everybody Knows You're Not in Love" (Lowe, Tulin) – 3:05
 "You've Never Had It Better" (Steve Poncher, R. Schwartz, P. Snagster) – 2:07

Personnel

Musicians
 James Lowe – vocals, autoharp, harmonica
 Ken Williams – lead guitar, effects
 James "Weasel" Spagnola – rhythm guitar, vocals (tracks 2-11, 13)
 Mike Gannon (uncredited) – rhythm guitar (tracks 1, 12, 14)
 Mark Tulin – bass, organ, piano
 Michael "Quint" Weakley – drums (tracks 2, 4, 8, 11-12)
 Preston Ritter (uncredited) – drums (tracks 1, 3, 5-7, 9-10)

Technical
 Dave Hassinger – producer, liner notes
 Richie Podolor – engineer
 Bill Cooper – engineer
 Ed Thrasher – art director
 Tom Tucker – photography

Covers
The track "Wind-Up Toys" was recorded as a demo by the psychedelic rock band Opal Butterfly in 1968. It has been included in psychedelic rock compilations including Psychedelic Schlemiels.

Charts

Billboard 200 (1967) - No. 172

References

The Electric Prunes albums
1967 albums
Reprise Records albums
Albums produced by David Hassinger